Ngong Wo is a village in Sai Kung District, Hong Kong.

Administration
Wong Chuk Wan, including Ngong Wo, is a recognized village under the New Territories Small House Policy.

References

External links
 Delineation of area of existing village Ngong Wo (Sai Kung) for election of resident representative (2019 to 2022)

Villages in Sai Kung District, Hong Kong